Regal Studio Presents is a Philippine television drama anthology broadcast by GMA Network. It premiered on September 11, 2021 on the network's Sabado Star Power sa Gabi line up.

Cast and characters

That Thin Line Between
 Sanya Lopez as Gemma Rose
 Ken Chan as Julius
 Shanelle Agustin
 Sandro Muhlach

Raya Sirena
 Sofia Pablo
 Allen Ansay

One Million Comments, Magjo-jowa na Ako!
 Gabbi Garcia as Ana Marie 
 Khalil Ramos as Prince Matt

Ikaw si Ako, Ako si Ikaw
 Shaira Diaz as Janice
 Kokoy de Santos as Marco
 Analyn Barro
 Darwin Yu

The Signs
 Bianca Umali as Moira
 Prince Carlos as Paul
 Gab Moreno as Patrick
 Carlo San Juan as Niel

Promises to Keep
 Mikee Quintos as Jenny
 Kelvin Miranda as Eloy
 Tyrone Tan
 Angel Guardian

My Birthday Wish
 Barbie Forteza as Joanna
 Royce Cabrera
 Julián Roxas
 Sarah Edwards

The Truth About Jane
 Joyce Ching
 Ashley Ortega
 Kiray Celis
 Anna Vicente

Karinderya Queens
 Maxine Medina as Dayanara
 Casie Banks as Sushmita
 Derrick Monasterio as Dante

Magkaibigan, Nagkaibigan
 Lexi Gonzales as Lanelle
 Kim De Leon as Jared
 Anjay Anson as Arjun

Anyare Sa'Yo
 Rita Daniela
 Jak Roberto

Bros B4 Rose
 Kim Domingo
 Jeric Gonzales
 Rob Gomez

Isn't She Lovely?
 Jelai Andres as Lovely
 David Licauco as Stephen
 Nikki Co as Winston
 Rob Gomez as Andrew
 Dustin Yu as Matt

Ratings
According to AGB Nielsen Philippines' Nationwide Urban Television Audience Measurement People in television homes, the pilot episode of Regal Studio Presents earned a 10.4% rating.

References

External links
 
 

2021 Philippine television series debuts
Filipino-language television shows
GMA Network original programming
Philippine anthology television series
Television shows set in the Philippines